Jonathan Entwistle, known as Jonty Entwhistle, (born Q3 1868 - 1904) was an English footballer who played in the Football League for Accrington and Darwen.

Early Career

Jonty Entwhistle in 1884 was signed as a Youth player with Darwen Rovers F.C. ( a club with no historical information). Darwen was Entwhistle' home town. 
In 1885 he signed for Haslingden F.C. Not the modern Haslingden and there are no records for the Victorian club.
Still as a Youth Player he signed for his first spell at Darwen aged 18. Entwhistle stayed at Darwen during the inaugral Football League season of 1888-89.

Season 1889-90
Accrington signed Entwhistle. He missed the first two weeks of the season. He made his Accrington and League debut on 21 September 1889 at Turf Moor, Burnley. Entwhistle played on the right-wing. Accrington drew the match 2-2.
Entwhistle kept his place on 28 September 1889 for the visit of Blackburn Rovers. Entwhistle scored both of Accrington' goals, including his debut goal, which earned Accrington a point. 
Entwhistle only missed three League games scoring nine League goals. He played in all but one of Accrington' nine wins. Accrington finished sixth, their highest position in their short time as a League club. 
Entwhistle played all three FA Cup ties scoring two in a 3-0 home First Round Replay win over West Bromwich Albion.

Statistics
Source:

References

1868 births
Date of death unknown
English footballers
Accrington F.C. players
Darwen F.C. players
Nelson F.C. players
Padiham F.C. players
English Football League players
Association football forwards